Pavel Sergeevich Chekhov (born 27 July 1988) is a retired Russian tennis player.

Tennis career 
On the junior tour, Chekhov had a career high ITF juniors combined ranking of 10, achieved in December 2006. Chekhov reached the semifinals of the boys' singles events at the 2006 Australian Open and the 2006 Wimbledon Championships.

Chekhov has a career high ATP singles ranking of 231 achieved on 28 April 2008. He also has a career high ATP doubles ranking of 187 achieved on 20 July 2007. Chekhov has won 2 ATP Challenger Tour doubles titles as well as 3 ITF Futures singles titles and 4 ITF Futures doubles titles.

Chekhov made his ATP main draw debut at the 2007 St. Petersburg Open in the singles event as a wildcard entrant.

ATP Challenger and ITF Futures finals

Singles: 7 (3–4)

Doubles: 9 (6–3)

External links 

1988 births
Living people
Russian male tennis players
Universiade medalists in tennis
Tennis players from Moscow
Universiade silver medalists for Russia
Medalists at the 2007 Summer Universiade